Cnemaspis timoriensis is a species of gecko endemic to  Timor.

References

timoriensis
Reptiles described in 1836
Taxa named by André Marie Constant Duméril
Taxa named by Gabriel Bibron